Paul Stuart is an men's and women's luxury clothing brand.  The company has four standalone boutiques in the US, and two in Japan. Since 2012, it has been owned by Mitsui.

Paul Stuart's style has been described as "clubby New York" or as a blend of “Savile Row, Connecticut living and the concrete canyons of New York.”  In that light, the Paul Stuart logo is a drawing of turn-of-the-century fictional character Dink Stover sitting on the Yale fence.

History
Harry Ostrove started Broadstreet's men's clothing stores in New York City in 1915.  Ralph worked for his father but left in 1938 to start Paul Stuart, so named for his son, Paul Stuart Ostrove.

The company was helmed by the legendary merchant and CEO Clifford Grodd from 1958 until his death in 2010.

In fall 2007, Paul Stuart launched its Phineas Cole range, which is clothing designed to appeal to a younger client although more exclusive in production and pricing.
 
The retailer remained a privately-held family business until December 2012, when it was sold to its long-time Japanese partners, Mitsui.

Paulette Garafalo, formerly of Brooks Brothers and Hickey Freeman, became CEO of Paul Stuart on June 14, 2016, marking the first time someone unrelated to the Ostrove family led the company.

In 2019, the company began offering a lower-priced made-to-measure service branded as customLAB, and a luxury MTM jeans service branded as denimBAR. In 2019, the company celebrated the redesign of its omnichannel e-commerce website with home delivery via vintage Packard automobile.

On July 1, 2022, Paulette Garafalo accepted a new role as Executive Chairman of Paul Stuart. Trevor Shimpfky was announced as President and CEO. Their creative director is Ralph Auriemma.

Retail locations
Paul Stuart has shops in New York City, Chicago, Washington DC, Osaka and Tokyo.

Since 1938, the original New York City flagship store has been located at the corner of Madison Avenue and 45th Street.

In the fall of 2008, Paul Stuart relocated its Chicago store from the John Hancock Center on Michigan Avenue to Oak Street. In the spring of 2011, Paul Stuart opened a second Chicago location in The Loop, at the corner of LaSalle Street and Adams Street in the historic Continental and Commercial National Bank building designed by Daniel Burnham, currently anchored by JW Marriott Hotels.

Both Chicago stores were broken  into and looted during the George Floyd protests in Chicago, and the Loop store in the JW Marriott was permanently closed.

The store in Washington, D.C. opened in spring 2015 in CityCenterDC.

Tokyo boutique stores are located in Omotesandō (Shibuya) and Ginza, and the Osaka boutique is in Shinsaibashi.

Paul Stuart shoes and boots are sold at Bloomingdales and Saks Fifth Avenue.

On 1 September 2020, Paul Stuart opened a second store in New York City. The 846 ft2 CustomLab store is located at 505 Broome Street and focuses on the brand's entry-level made-to-measure tailored clothing.

Clientele 
Paul Stuart's style has been described as a blend of “Savile Row, Connecticut living and the concrete canyons of New York.” Michael Bloomberg, Cary Grant, Frank Sinatra, Paul Newman, Miles Davis, Art Blakey, Ron Carter, and Billy Taylor were customers of the brand.

In fact, in its early years, "Paul Stuart became known as the poor man's Brooks Brothers, although the store has since become pricier than Brooks."

Paul Stuart dressed Cary Grant in Hitchcock's North by Northwest. The brand has been worn in Succession.

See also
Oxxford Clothes
Brooks Brothers 
J. Press
Hartmarx
Hickey Freeman

References

External links

Ralph Ostrove NYT Obit

Clothing brands of the United States
Clothing retailers of the United States
Shops in New York City
Suit makers
Clothing companies established in 1938
Retail companies established in 1938
1938 establishments in New York City
Commercial buildings in Manhattan